Crystal arthropathy is a class of joint disorder (called arthropathy) that is characterized by accumulation of tiny crystals in one or more joints. Polarizing microscopy and application of other crystallographic techniques have improved identification of different microcrystals including monosodium urate, calcium pyrophosphate dihydrate, calcium hydroxyapatite, and calcium oxalate.

Types

Causes
Deposition of crystals in joints
Calcium pyrophosphate dihydrate crystal formation:
Increased production of inorganic pyrophosphate
Decreased levels of pyrophosphatase in cartilage
Decreased levels of cartilage glycosaminoglycans
Hyperparathyroidism
Hemochromatosis
Hypophosphatasia
Hypomagnesemia
Hydroxyapatite deposition:
Tissue damage
Hyperparathyroidism
Hypercalcemia
Hyperphosphatemia
Calcium oxalate deposition:
Enhanced production of oxalic acid due to enzyme defect
Poor excretion of oxalic acid in kidney failure
Excessive ascorbic acid intake in kidney failure

Risk factors
Obesity
Kidney failure
Hyperphosphatemia
Hyperparathyroidism
Hypercalcemia
Tissue damage (dystrophic calcification)

Diagnosis

Differential diagnosis
Septic arthritis
Type IIa hyperlipoproteinemia
Amyloidosis
Multicentric reticulohistiocytosis
Hyperparathyroidism
Spondyloarthropathy
Rheumatoid arthritis

Treatment

References

External links 

Inflammatory polyarthropathies